Lawrence Patrick Hill (born December 17, 1951) is an American football coach, former player, and broadcaster. He served as the head football coach at Fresno State from 1997 until his dismissal following the 2011 season. In 15 seasons as head coach as Fresno State, he led the Bulldogs to a record of 112–80, 11 bowl game appearances, and a share of the 1999 Western Athletic Conference title.

Early positions
Hill attended Rim of the World High School in Lake Arrowhead, California, graduating in 1970.  A 1973 graduate of, and an offensive lineman for the University of California, Riverside, Hill was the offensive line coach at Los Angeles Valley College from 1974 to 1976. In 1977, he became the offensive line coach at the University of Utah, where he would stay through 1980.  This was followed by short stints at UNLV in 1981 and 1982, and a one-year stay in the Canadian Football League with the Calgary Stampeders in 1983. After an assistant coaching job at Fresno State, Hill went on to become the offensive coordinator at the University of Arizona from 1990 to 1991.  He then went to coach in the National Football League with the Cleveland Browns (under Bill Belichick) and the Baltimore Ravens, where he served as the tight ends and offensive line coach for both teams.

Fresno State
Hill took on the head coaching job at Fresno State in 1997, where he had previously served as the offensive line coach from 1984 to 1989.  Coming into the 2005 season, Hill had compiled a 64–38 win–loss record, including a 44–19 Western Athletic Conference mark, one WAC title, and a 10–8 record against BCS AQ conference teams, the most by any BCS non-AQ conference team.  Under Hill Fresno State routinely scheduled—and defeated—highly ranked opponents from power conferences.  Taking his cue from how Bobby Bowden turned Florida State into a powerhouse, Hill let it be known soon after arriving in Fresno that his Bulldogs would play "anybody, anywhere, anytime."

Hill currently has 18 
wins over BCS automatic qualifying conference teams, which is tied for the most wins for any non-automatic qualifier with Utah.  In 2001, when Fresno State went 11–3, they reeled off wins over Colorado, #22 Oregon State, and #23 Wisconsin in 3 of their first 4 games.  In 2002 they beat #25 Colorado State. In 2004 they beat #13 Kansas State. During his tenure, Hill also went 4–7 in bowl games.

On December 4, 2011, Hill was let go by Fresno State, despite his achievements for such a location.

During his tenure, he coached a number of NFL players including: QB Tom Brandstater, QB David Carr, QB Derek Carr, QB Billy Volek, RB Ryan Mathews, RB Lonyae Miller, RB Michael Pittman, RB Bryson Sumlin, RB Derrick Ward, RB Dwayne Wright, WR Seyi Ajirotutu, WR Bernard Berrian, WR Paul Williams, WR Devon Wylie, TE Bear Pascoe, OT Chris Conrad, OG Logan Mankins, OG Ryan Wendell, LB Orlando Huff, CB Vernon Fox, CB Richard Marshall, CB Will Middleton, S Tyrone Culver, S Cory Hall, and S James Sanders.

Atlanta Falcons
On January 28, 2012, Hill agreed to be the Atlanta Falcons' offensive line coach.  He left the team after the 2013 season.

Broadcasting career
Hill joined 940 ESPN as color commentator for Fresno State football broadcasts effective in the 2015 season.

Head coaching record

References

External links
 Atlanta Falcons bio

1951 births
Living people
American football offensive linemen
American sports radio personalities
Arizona Wildcats football coaches
Baltimore Ravens coaches
College football announcers
Calgary Stampeders coaches
Cleveland Browns coaches
Fresno State Bulldogs football coaches
UC Riverside Highlanders football players
Utah Utes football coaches
UNLV Rebels football coaches
Junior college football coaches in the United States
Sportspeople from Los Angeles
Sportspeople from San Bernardino County, California
Players of American football from Los Angeles
Coaches of American football from California
Sports coaches from Los Angeles